The Syrena 110 was a  Polish automobile prototype from the mid-1960s,  manufactured by the Fabryka Samochodów Osobowych (FSO) in Warsaw. It was one of the first hatchbacks in the world.

History 
In 1961 there started works in the Automotive Industry Construction Bureau (Biuro Konstrukcyjne Przemysłu Motoryzacyjnego, BKPMot) upon a new small family car to replace the FSO Syrena, which was quite new at that time, but was not a modern design. There were built three prototypes, Alfa (rear drive), Beta and Delta (both front drive).  At the same, the Construction Bureau of the FSO factory worked upon a new model. In 1964 both teams merged their efforts. The new car was supposed to enter production in 1968.

The car was fitted with a most modern at that time angular-style three-door hatchback body (at the same time, as Renault 16). An interesting design feature was a partial frame in a forward part, enabling dismounting of the whole forward part with an engine. The engine was inherited from the newest Syrena 104 - S-31, 842 cc two stroke straight-3, but a four stroke engine was predicted in the future. A suspension was independent, with spiral springs.

In spite of a generally successful design, only a test batch of less than 20 Syrena 110 was manufactured in 1965-1966. The Syrena 110, that could become a modern and practical popular car, fell victim to a communist planned economy. In view of limited resources of the FSO factory, and neglecting needs for a popular mas-produced car, the Polish authorities decided to cease further works upon the Syrena 110, because of a license agreement to manufacture a mid-class Polski Fiat 125p. Only in the 1970s, after a political change, there appeared a much smaller popular car Polski Fiat 126p. A test batch of Syrena 110 were sold to private hands, and remained in use until the 1980s. At least two cars survived, one in the Motorization Museum in Warsaw (a division of Museum of Technology, Warsaw).

References 

Zakrzewski, Adam (2010) . Auto-moto PRL: władcy dróg i poboczy, Demart, Warsaw, 

Syrena
Science and technology in Poland
1960s cars